Mike Ferry (born April 13, 1974) is an American rower. He competed in the men's double sculls event at the 2000 Summer Olympics.

References

External links
 

1974 births
Living people
American male rowers
Olympic rowers of the United States
Rowers at the 2000 Summer Olympics
People from Princeton, New Jersey